Barber–Scotia College is a private unaccredited historically black college in Concord, North Carolina. It is affiliated with the Presbyterian Church (USA).

History

Scotia Seminary

Barber–Scotia began as a female seminary in 1867. Scotia Seminary was founded by the Reverend Luke Dorland and chartered in 1870. A project by the Presbyterian Church to prepare young African American southern women (the daughters of former slaves) for careers as social workers and teachers, it was the coordinate women's school for Biddle University (now Johnson C. Smith University).

It was the first historically black female institution of higher education established after the American Civil War. The Charlotte Observer, in an interview with Janet Magaldi, president of Piedmont Preservation Foundation, stated, "Scotia Seminary was one of the first black institutions built after the Civil War. For the first time, it gave black women an alternative to becoming domestic servants or field hands."

Scotia Seminary was modeled after Mount Holyoke Female Seminary (now Mount Holyoke College) and was referred to as "The Mount Holyoke of the South". The seminary offered grammar, science, and domestic arts. In 1908 it had 19 teachers and 291 students. From its founding in 1867 to 1908 it had enrolled 2,900 students, with 604 having graduated from the grammar department and 109 from the normal department.  Faith Hall, built in 1891, was the first dormitory at Scotia Seminary. It is listed in National Register of Historic Places and "is one of only four 19th-century institutional buildings left in Cabarrus County." It was closed by the college during the 1970s due to lack of funds for its maintenance.

1916–2004
It was renamed to Scotia Women's College in 1916.  In 1930, the seminary was merged with another female institution, Barber Memorial College, which was founded in 1896 in Anniston, Alabama by Margaret M. Barber as a memorial to her husband. This merger created Barber–Scotia Junior College for women.

The school granted its first bachelor's degree in 1945, and became a four-year women's college in 1946. In 1954, Barber–Scotia College became a coeducational institution and received accreditation from the Southern Association of Colleges and Schools. Today, the college maintains close ties to the Presbyterian Church.

2004–2008
On June 24, 2004, one week after appointing its new president, Gloria Bromell Tinubu, the college learned that it had lost its accreditation which meant that students became ineligible for federal aid and that many employees would be laid off. It lost its accreditation due to what the Southern Association of Colleges and Schools said was a failure to comply with SACS Principles and Philosophy of Accreditation (Integrity), as the school "awarded degrees to nearly 30 students in the adult program who SACS determined hadn't fulfilled the proper requirements".

Former President Sammie Potts resigned in February when it became public.  As over 90% of the students at Barber–Scotia received some sort of federal financial aid, when the campus lost accreditation and was therefore no longer eligible to receive federal financial aid for its students, under the Department of Education enrollment then dropped from 600 students in 2004 to 91 students in 2005 and on-campus housing was closed down.

During her tenure President Gloria Bromell Tinubu led a strategic planning effort to change the college from a four-year liberal arts program to a college of entrepreneurship and business, and established partnerships with accredited colleges and top-tiered universities. She would later leave the college when the new Board leadership decided to pursue religious studies instead.  Former President and alumna Mable Parker McLean was hired as president on an interim basis. In February 2006 a committee of the General Assembly Council of the Presbyterian Church (USA) voted to continue the denomination's financial support for Barber–Scotia, noting that its physical facilities were "substantial and well-secured" and that the school was undertaking serious planning for the future. In May 2006, it was reported that Barber–Scotia would rent space on its campus to St. Augustine's College to use for an adult-education program: "Under the terms of the deal, St. Augustine's will pay Barber–Scotia for the space for its Gateway degree program starting this fall."

McLean was replaced by President David Olah who accepted the position without payment and the college re-opened with a limited number of students. During this time, the "previous attempts to revive the college [which] have centered on an entrepreneurial or business curriculum" were formally abandoned "in favor of focusing more on religious studies". Flamer also worked to eliminate debt and worked with alumni and the community to save the college.  Olah left in 2015, to be replaced by Yvonne Tracey, who departed at the end of 2015.

2009–present 
Barber–Scotia had an enrollment of 120 full-time students. The college offered the following four degree programs: Bachelor of Arts in Business, Bachelor of Arts in Religious Studies, Bachelor of Arts in Sports Management and a Bachelor of Science in Bio-Energy. Each academic discipline has several fields of concentration.  The school closed for the Spring Semester of the 2015–2016 academic year to restructure and implement its new strategic plan.

In September 2016, the newly elected Board of Trustees hired David Olah as president to once again lead the college. Twelve students enrolled, as Barber-Scotia reopened its doors for the fall semester. The college anticipated receiving more than 150 students in the coming semesters.

Rice Access Financial published a request for qualifications, with a deadline for submissions of December 20, 2017 for "developers that had interest in working with the college for possible development opportunities". In February 2018 the Independent Tribune said the college was being sold and a school might be built there. In a response, trustees said that while the college still couldn't offer federal financial aid yet, several programs were still offered which trained students for jobs.  President Olah said that while the college owed millions, it was not for sale. He said degrees were offered through the North Carolina Department of Education in religious studies, renewable energy, business entrepreneurship and sports management, and projected enrollment was 100 to 115.

On March 16, 2019, the college's alumni association held a meeting about the college's future. At that time, the Independent Tribune claimed the college was holding no classes. Melvin Isadore Douglass became the college's president in April 2019, and an official inauguration was planned in January 2020. According to the Independent Tribune, most of the college's 45 students were taking classes online.

In January 2020 the Barber-Scotia Property Task Force started working on plans for what to do with the campus. After meetings with community leaders, it was determined possible uses for campus buildings as of September 2020 included a school, a museum, and a business center. Because the gym was in good shape with a pool that could be used, an aquatics center was another possibility. Faith Hall, Graves Hall and Leland S. Cozart House were on the National Register of Historic Places and would likely be preserved, but some of those buildings were in such bad shape no one could go inside.

In February 2021, the city and the college made a formal agreement to work together.

Douglass and Chairwoman Karen M. Soares, with the aid of Congresswoman Alma Adams, were able to get a 21-year, estimated, $12 million loan forgiven. This program was administered by the Department of Education's HBCU Capital Finance Program. The program provided low-cost capital to finance improvements to the infrastructure of the nation's Historically Black Colleges and Universities.

The Association for Biblical Higher Education said the college had inquired about accreditation but as of July 2021 had not started the process, which would take eight to ten years.

A community survey received a strong response, and studies were planned for renovating and reusing the buildings. A partnership with Cabarrus County Schools was considered. After lack of cooperation from college leaders, the agreement with the city ended in November 2021.  

According to a February 1, 2022 press release, Douglass and Soares resigned. Tracey Flemmings was named interim president, and Roberta Pinckney became chair.

An August 2022 article in the Independent Tribune said, "seven of the 15 buildings are deemed unoccupiable", that six others needed violations to be corrected, and that the college had awarded no degrees in 18 years. The article said that none of the college's leaders lived in the county, and that the college claimed to have 24 students who would be studying entrepreneurship, religion, and renewable energy in September 2022. The article also said college leaders announced a partnership with the unaccredited, for-profit Medcerts for health services training online. The Cabarrus County tax assessor was determining whether the college still qualified as a nonprofit; if not, land and buildings worth almost $12 million could be sold.

As of December 2022 The Charlotte Observer reported four students were taking classes, all online. An investigation by WSOC-TV revealed that Cabarrus County was considering ending the college's tax exemption.

In a March 16, 2023 news release, the city announced that a task force formed in 2017 to help the college was disbanding. The task force accused the college of not cooperating.

Athletics
Barber–Scotia College's athletic programs were known as the Mighty Sabers, and were members of the United States Collegiate Athletic Association (USCAA) until 2015. Barber–Scotia formerly competed in the National Association of Intercollegiate Athletics (NAIA), primarily in the now-defunct Eastern Intercollegiate Athletic Conference (EIAC) until the end of the 2004–2005 season, during the time the school lost its accreditation and could no longer field athletics teams. B-SC currently fields men's and women's basketball teams, and a baseball team.

Notable alumni

Scotia Seminary
Emma Jane Wilson studied at Scotia Seminary, became a missionary, teacher, and eventually established an industrial school in Mayesville, South Carolina. She taught and mentored one of Scotia Seminary's most notable alumnae, Mary McLeod Bethune, who  started a school for black students in Daytona Beach, Florida that eventually merged to become Bethune–Cookman University. Bethune was an influential leader and  an advisor to President Franklin D. Roosevelt.

Barber–Scotia College 
Katie Geneva Cannon received a Bachelor of Science degree, went on to earn a Master of Divinity from Johnson C. Smith Theological Seminary, and became the first black woman ordained in the United Presbyterian Church in the United States of America. She later earned Master of Philosophy and Doctor of Philosophy degrees from Union Theological Seminary in New York City and is currently the Annie Scales Rogers Professor of Christian Ethics at Union Presbyterian Seminary in Richmond, Virginia.

Further reading
Cozart, Leland Stanford. A Venture of Faith: Barber–Scotia College, 1867–1967. Charlotte, NC: Heritage Printers, 1976.
Gross, Leslie. "Faith Hall: A Landmark in Need of Friends." The Charlotte Observer. May 9, 1999: 3K.
Barber–Scotia College. National Register of Historic Places designation report. Washington, DC: U.S. Department of the Interior/National Park Service, 1985.
 African American Registry. "History of Scotia Seminary"
Scotia Seminary 1881–82 Catalogue
Scotia Seminary: North Carolina and Its Resources (1896)
State Library of North Carolina. "Scotia Seminary, Concord N.C. (1908)"
Data for Historically Black Colleges and Universities: 1976–1994 – Government publication which includes enrollment statistics for Barber–Scotia College

References

External links

Photographs 
 Postcard images of Scotia Seminary – University of North Carolina
 Photograph of Scotia Seminary, 1893
 Buds of Promise – 19th century graduates of Scotia Seminary
 Photographs of Barber-Scotia and Marker

Historically black universities and colleges in the United States
Former women's universities and colleges in the United States
Private universities and colleges in North Carolina
Johnson C. Smith University
Education in Cabarrus County, North Carolina
University and college buildings on the National Register of Historic Places in North Carolina
Presbyterianism in North Carolina
Unaccredited Christian universities and colleges in the United States
Educational institutions established in 1867
Second Empire architecture in North Carolina
Italianate architecture in North Carolina
Colonial Revival architecture in North Carolina
Buildings and structures in Cabarrus County, North Carolina
USCAA member institutions
National Register of Historic Places in Cabarrus County, North Carolina
Universities and colleges affiliated with the Presbyterian Church (USA)